John DeGruchy (December 15, 1860January 23, 1940) was the president of the Ontario Rugby Football Union for 25 years, and he promoted the Thanksgiving Day Classic between the Sarnia Imperials and the Toronto Balmy Beach Beachers. He was inducted into the Canadian Football Hall of Fame in 1963 and into the Canada's Sports Hall of Fame in 1975.

External links
 Canada's Sports Hall of Fame profile

1860 births
1940 deaths
Canadian Football Hall of Fame inductees